Georgios Kondylis (14 August 1878 – 1 February 1936) was a Greek general, politician and prime minister of Greece. He was nicknamed Keravnos, Greek for "thunder" or "thunderbolt".

Military career

Kondylis was born in Proussós. He enlisted in the army as a volunteer in 1896, and fought with the Greek expeditionary corps in Crete. He was later commissioned and participated in the Macedonian Struggle (1904–1908) leading his own guerrilla band, and was promoted to captain during the Balkan Wars (1912–1913). He supported the Movement of National Defence of Eleftherios Venizelos during the First World War. He was notorious for his cruel oppression of a loyalist revolt in Chalkidiki (Sept 1916), rising to the rank of lieutenant colonel. A firm Venizelist, he opposed the restoration of King Constantine I in 1920, fleeing to Constantinople together with other Venizelist officers and organizing there the "Democratic Defence" (Δημοκρατική Άμυνα). He returned after the 1922 Revolution as a major general, suppressed the royalist revolt of 1923, retired from the army, and became involved in politics.

Political career
He was elected to Parliament at the 1923 elections for the constituency of Rodope, initially for the Democratic Union, and later founded the National Republican Party (Εθνικό Δημοκρατικό Κόμμα), renamed in 1928 National Radical Party (Εθνικό Ριζοσπαστικό Κόμμα). He was war minister from March to June 1924. On 24 August 1926, he overthrew the dictatorship of Theodoros Pangalos in a bloodless coup and formed a government, proclaiming elections for November. Notably, his party did not participate in these. In the elections of August 1928, voters elected nine of his party's candidates as MPs, and he was elected in Kavala.

During this time, Kondylis began moving rightward. In 1932 he became war minister again in return for his support of the Populist government, a post he retained after the Populists were reelected in 1933. From this post he was instrumental in crushing the March 1935 Venizelist revolt. In the period immediately following the revolt, Kondylis became the real power in the country. He sacked numerous pro-republican soldiers and civil servants, and condemned Venizelos to death in absentia.

By now, Kondylis was one of the strongest proponents of restoring the monarchy. However, he opposed Prime Minister Panagis Tsaldaris' call for a referendum. On 10 October 1935, Kondylis and several other officers called on Tsaldaris and forced him to resign. Kondylis forced President Alexandros Zaimis to name him the new premier. Later that day, Kondylis forced Zaimis to resign, declared himself Regent, abolished the Republic and staged a plebiscite on 3 November for the return of the monarchy.

The official tally showed that 98 percent of the voters supported the return of George II—an implausibly high total that could have only been obtained through massive fraud. Indeed, the vote took place under less-than-secret conditions. Voters were given the choice of dropping a blue piece of paper in the ballot box if they supported the monarchy, and a red one if they supported the republic. Those who supported the republic risked being beaten up. Under those circumstances, it took a brave Greek to vote "no".  By this time, Kondylis had turned so far to the right that he now openly sympathized with fascism. He hoped to echo Benito Mussolini's example in Italy, in which Victor Emmanuel III had been reduced to a puppet.

George returned to Greece on 25 November, and retained Kondylis as prime minister. Kondylis soon quarreled with the king, who was not content to be a mere puppet, and resigned five days later. In the January 1936 elections, he cooperated with Ioannis Rallis and managed to have fifteen MPs elected. Soon after, however, he died of a heart attack on 1 February 1936, in Athens. His nephew, George Kondylis Jr., became a general in the Greek army and later fought against the Axis during the German invasion of Greece. 

He was awarded Serbian Order of the White Eagle.

References

External links
 

1878 births
1936 deaths
20th-century regents of Greece
20th-century prime ministers of Greece
People from Evrytania
Regents of Greece
Prime Ministers of Greece
Deputy Prime Ministers of Greece
Ministers of Military Affairs of Greece
Hellenic Army lieutenant generals
Greek military personnel of World War I
Greek military personnel of the Balkan Wars
Greek military personnel of the Greco-Turkish War (1919–1922)
Greek military personnel of the Macedonian Struggle
Leaders who took power by coup
19th-century Greek people
Ministers of Naval Affairs of Greece